James Lucius Whitley (May 24, 1872 – May 17, 1959) was an American politician from New York.

Life
Whitley was born in Rochester, New York. He graduated from the law department of Union College in 1898. He served as a sergeant in the Spanish–American War.

He was a member of the New York State Assembly (Monroe Co., 2nd D.) in 1906, 1907, 1908, 1909 and 1910.

He was a member of the New York State Senate (45th D.) from 1919 to 1928, sitting in the 142nd, 143rd, 144th, 145th, 146th, 147th, 148th, 149th, 150th and 151st New York State Legislatures.

He was elected as a Republican to the 71st, 72nd and 73rd United States Congress, holding office from March 4, 1929, to January 3, 1935.

He died on May 17, 1959, in Rochester, New York.  He was buried at Mount Hope Cemetery.

References

Union College (New York) alumni
1872 births
1959 deaths
Republican Party members of the New York State Assembly
Politicians from Rochester, New York
Republican Party New York (state) state senators
Republican Party members of the United States House of Representatives from New York (state)
Burials at Mount Hope Cemetery (Rochester)